John A. Eisenberg (born 1966/1967) is an American lawyer who served as a deputy counsel to the President of the United States and legal advisor to the U.S. National Security Council during the presidency of Donald Trump.  He was selected by former National Security Advisor Michael Flynn. Earlier in his career, from 2006 to 2009, he served in the Department of Justice.

Early life and career
Eisenberg received a Bachelor of Science in mathematics from Stanford University and a Juris Doctor from Yale Law School. He worked as an associate deputy attorney general during the Presidency of George W. Bush. He was a partner in the Washington, D.C. law office of Kirkland & Ellis.

In 2017, Eisenberg was appointed Deputy Assistant to the President, National Security Council Legal Advisor, and Deputy Counsel to the President for National Security Affairs by former National Security Advisor Michael Flynn and part of the National Security Council.

Trump Tower wiretapping allegations

On March 29, 2017, The New York Times reported that Michael Ellis and Ezra Cohen-Watnick were involved in the leaking of intelligence documents to Representative Devin Nunes, chair of the House Intelligence Committee. The following day, The Washington Post reported that Eisenberg was also involved. In April 2017, the Associated Press quoted a U.S. official as saying that although Cohen-Watnick had access to those kinds of intelligence materials, he did not play a role in helping Nunes gain access to the documents. According to a U.S. official, Cohen-Watnick was not involved in showing the material to Nunes, did not clear Nunes onto the White House grounds, did not review the material with Nunes, and was not even aware that the material was going to be shared with Nunes.

Trump–Ukraine scandal

Eisenberg ordered a transcript of a Trump call with Ukraine's president be moved to a highly classified server and played a role in the Justice Department's early handling of the Trump–Ukraine scandal. The whistleblower initially submitted concerns anonymously to Courtney Elwood, general counsel of the CIA. Elwood then contacted Justice Department officials and Eisenberg. Eisenberg was notified by both Fiona Hill and Alexander Vindman that they were concerned about inappropriate comments to Ukrainian officials by European Union Ambassador Gordon Sondland and President Donald Trump.

Per Vindman's testimony, Eisenberg instructed Vindman not to tell anyone about the Trump call to President Volodymyr Zelensky. In early November 2019, Eisenberg was subpoenaed to testify by the House Intelligence Committee but refused.

See also
Timeline of investigations into Trump and Russia (2017)
Timeline of investigations into Trump and Russia (2019)

References

External links

Stanford University alumni
Yale Law School alumni
United States National Security Council staffers
Trump administration personnel
Year of birth missing (living people)
Living people
 Law clerks of J. Michael Luttig
People associated with Kirkland & Ellis